Chabula vedonalis is a moth of the family Crambidae first described by Charles Swinhoe in 1894. It is found in India.

References

Moths described in 1894
Spilomelinae